The 1st Minnesota Heavy Artillery Regiment was a Minnesota USV artillery regiment during the American Civil War.

Service
The 1st Minnesota Heavy Artillery Regiment mustered in at St. Paul, and  Rochester, Minnesota, between November 1864 and February 1865. Many of the officers were recruited from discharged veterans: sergeants from the 1st Minnesota while  corporals came from the 3rd, 4th, and 5th Minnesota Vol. Regiments.  The 1st Minnesota Heavy was composed of twelve companies / batteries, of 140 men plus officers in each.  It was the largest unit Minnesota sent to war numbering 1700 men.

The regiment was assigned to garrison duty at Chattanooga, Tennessee.  There it was in charge of the heavy guns at forts defending the city in anticipation  Southern General John Hood might try and retake the Chattanooga. The regiment saw no combat, remained there until the close of the war. The 1st Minnesota "Heavies" were mustered out of service on September 27, 1865.

Albert Woolson, who was a 14-year-old company drummer in the regiment, became the last surviving veteran of the American Civil War from either side. He died in 1956.

Commanding officers
Lt. Colonel Luther L. Baxter, February 25, 1865, to April 26, 1865.
Colonel William Colvill, April 26, 1865, to May 6, 1865.
Colonel Luther L. Baxter, May 7, 1865, to September 27, 1865.

Casualties and total strength
The regiment lost 87 enlisted men to disease. Many more suffered from scurvy and would never regain complete health.

References

External links
The Civil War Archive
 Minnesota Historical Society page on Minnesota and the Civil War

See also
List of Minnesota Civil War Units

1st Minnesota Volunteer Heavy Artillery Regiment'''
1864 establishments in Minnesota
Artillery units and formations of the American Civil War
Military units and formations established in 1864
Military units and formations disestablished in 1865